Born to Battle is a 1927 American silent Western film directed by Alan James and starring Bill Cody, Barbara Luddy and Nora Cecil.

Cast
 Bill Cody as Billy Cowan
 Barbara Luddy as Barbara Barstow
 Nora Cecil as Ma Cowan
 J.P. Lockney as Luke Barstow
 Sheldon Lewis as Hank Tolliver
 Olin Francis as Zack Cowan
 Frank McGlynn Jr. as Sim Cowan 
 Ralph Yearsley as Jasper Cowan
 Lew Meehan as Joe Leary 
 Sailor Sharkey as Bulldog Bangs
 Bob Burns as Sheriff 
 Alfred Hewston as Tex

References

External links
 

1927 films
1927 Western (genre) films
American black-and-white films
Pathé Exchange films
Films directed by Alan James
Silent American Western (genre) films
1920s English-language films
1920s American films